Yudh Abhyas is an annual training practice between United States Army and Indian Army.

Objectives 

Yudh Abhyas is a bilateral practice session on warfare related activities between Army of India and United States. Eighteenth edition of yudh abhyas was conducted in year 2022 in Uttarakhand, India. In year 2021, the joint training was conducted in Alaska, United States.

Training Exercises 

Yudh Abhyas training includes various types of technical and operational activities exchanged between armies of India and United States.

See also 

 Indian Defence Force

References 

Military exercises involving the United States
Military exercises and wargames